The following is a list of seasons played by Kastrup Boldklub from the founding of the club up to the most recent season.

Key

 P = Played
 W = Games won
 D = Games drawn
 L = Games lost
 F = Goals for
 A = Goals against
 Pts = Points
 Position = Final position in table

 Level = Level in the football league system
 Avg. Att. = Average attendance at home
 Europe = European competition entered
 Other = Other relevant competitions
 Result = Result in that competition

 — = Did not Qualify
 Group = Group stage
 DSQ = Disqualified
 DNE = Did not enter
 QR1 = First Qualifying Round
 QR2 = Second Qualifying Round
 QR3 = Third Qualifying Round

 R1 = Round 1
 R2 = Round 2
 R3 = Round 3
 R4 = Round 4
 R16 = Round of 16
 QF = Quarter-finals
 SF = Semi-finals
 RU = Runners-Up
 W = Winners

Danmarksturneringen i fodbold 

1: League games only, not including championship, promotion and relegation play-offs
2: Status as reserve team for Amager United. Amager United played using Kastrup Boldklub's league license
3: Status as reserve team for FC Amager

References

External links 
 Official website

Seasons
Kastrup Boldklub